The 3rd Legislative Assembly of British Columbia sat from 1878 to 1882. The members were elected in the British Columbia general election held in May 1878. George Anthony Walkem was asked to form a government. Robert Beaven succeeded Walkem as premier in June 1882.

There were five sessions of the 3rd Legislature:

Frederick W. Williams served as speaker.

Members of the 3rd General Assembly 
The following members were elected to the assembly in 1878:

Notes:

By-elections 
By-elections were held for the following members appointed to the provincial cabinet, as was required at the time. All elections were won by acclamation:
Thomas Basil Humphreys, Provincial Secretary and Minister of Mines, acclaimed July 10, 1878
Robert Beaven, Minister of Finance and Agriculture, acclaimed July 10, 1878
George Anthony Boomer Walkem Premier, acclaimed August 3, 1878

By-elections were held to replace members for various other reasons:

Notes:

Other changes 
Cariboo (res. George Anthony Boomer Walkem 1882)

References 

Political history of British Columbia
Terms of British Columbia Parliaments
1878 establishments in British Columbia
1882 disestablishments in British Columbia